Austin Scott Miller (born May 15, 1961) is a retired four-star general in the United States Army and former Delta Force commander who served as the final commander of NATO's Resolute Support Mission and United States Forces - Afghanistan from September 2, 2018 to July 12, 2021. He previously served as the commander of Joint Special Operations Command from March 30, 2016 to August 2018. He participated in numerous combat operations, such as the Battle of Mogadishu in 1993, and, since 2001, the wars in Iraq and Afghanistan. He retired from the Army in December after relinquishing command in July 2021. Miller currently serves on the board of advisors for Striveworks.

Early life and education
Miller was born in Honolulu, Hawaii on May 15, 1961. He graduated from the United States Military Academy in 1983 and was commissioned as an infantry officer in the United States Army.

Military career

Miller was commissioned as a second lieutenant in 1983 after graduation from United States Military Academy at West Point. After completing Ranger School, he was assigned a platoon in 3rd Battalion, 325th Infantry (Airborne), 82nd Airborne Division. Afterward, he was a platoon leader with A Company, 2nd Ranger Battalion, 75th Ranger Regiment from January 1986 to May 1987. He completed Infantry Officer Advanced Course in June 1989. He was assigned to South Korea as a Company Commander with 5th Battalion, 20th Infantry (Mechanized), 2nd Infantry Division, Eighth United States Army. Later, he was an instructor at the Special Operations Division School of the Americas at Fort Benning, Georgia from April 1991 to April 1992. 

In 1992, Miller completed a specialized selection course and operator training course for assignment to 1st Special Forces Operational Detachment – Delta (1st SFOD-D), or Delta Force at Fort Bragg, North Carolina, where he held numerous leadership positions including squadron operations officer, troop commander, operational support troop commander, selection and training commander, A Squadron commander, as well as deputy commander and unit commanding officer from 2005 to 2007. 

He participated in numerous combat operations during Operation Gothic Serpent in Somalia, Operation Joint Endeavor in Bosnia, Operation Enduring Freedom and Operation Iraqi Freedom. In October 1993, Miller was the ground force commander during the Battle of Mogadishu while Lieutenant Colonel Gary L. Harrell held operational command of C Squadron, 1st SFOD-D. Miller graduated from United States Army Command and General Staff College in June 1997. He is a graduate of the United States Marine Corps War College, 2003 and Joint and Combined Warfighting School.
 
As a Colonel, Miller received an assignment as Director of the Interagency Task Force, United States Special Operations Command, MacDill Air Force Base, Florida from August 2007 to June 2008. He was assigned Deputy Director for Special Operations, J-37, The Joint Staff, Washington, D.C. till 2009. From September 2011 through August 2012, Miller was special assistant to the Director of the Joint Improvised Explosive Device Defeat Organization in Arlington, Virginia. 

He was a special assistant to the deputy commanding general, United States Special Operations Command in Washington D.C. from August 2012 through June 2013. From June 2013 to June 2014, Miller was commanding general of the Combined Forces Special Operations Component Command in Afghanistan, or CFSOCC-A, responsible for employment and coordination of special operations forces and assets to achieve NATO and US military objectives. In 2014, he became commanding general of the United States Army Maneuver Center of Excellence at Fort Benning. From 2016 to 2018, Miller served as the commanding general of the Joint Special Operations Command.

Commander of U.S. and NATO forces in Afghanistan 

In 2018, he assumed command of United States Forces — Afghanistan and NATO's Resolute Support mission, after a successful June 2018 visit to the Senate Armed Services Committee.
 
On October 18, 2018, Miller was in the room at the governor's compound in southern Kandahar when a Taliban gunman shot provincial police chief Abdul Raziq. Miller was not harmed, but drew his sidearm during the shooting, waited until the wounded were attended, and flew out with the casualties afterwards which included Brigadier General Jeffrey Smiley, who was wounded in the attack.

On July 1, 2021, Miller gave an exclusive on-camera interview to ABC, with a helicopter flyover of the Bagram Air Base to emphasize its emptiness.

Miller officially furled the mission flag and marked the symbolic end to Operation Resolute Support on July 12, 2021. After Bagram, the largest U.S. base in Afghanistan, was vacated, parts of the base were looted as the Americans did not inform the Afghani district administrator Darwaish Raufi of their departure. Miller was quoted as saying, "A civil war is certainly a path that can be visualized if this continues on the trajectory it's on right now, that should be of concern to the world." In a short farewell ceremony attended by many senior Afghan officials, Miller pledged that “the people of Afghanistan will be in my heart, and on my mind, for the rest of my life.” On July 14, 2021, he met with President Joe Biden who thanked him for his service and his “extraordinary service in Afghanistan.”

Miller testified before the Senate Armed Services Committee on September 15, 2021 on the Biden administration's decision to withdraw from Afghanistan, asserting that he had recommended that not all U.S. forces be immediately withdrawn.

His retirement in the grade of general was officially approved by Congress on December 8, 2021.

Scams using Miller's name and image 
Miller's name and image are frequently used to set up fake social media accounts to defraud people, especially elderly women in so-called "romance scams." U.S. Forces-Afghanistan has reported almost 900 fake accounts posing as Miller on sites like Twitter, Facebook and Instagram just during the first few months of 2021. The accounts are largely used to trick people out of money and items like gift cards and cellphones, USFOR-A warned. “Gen. Miller does NOT use public accounts on social media. Scammers are using his likeness & photos,” USFOR-A spokesman Col. Sonny Leggett said in a tweet.  Anyone wishing to report a fake Miller account should contact USFOR-A.

Dates of rank

Awards and decorations

References

|-

1961 births
Living people
Marine Corps War College alumni
United States Army personnel of the Iraq War
United States Army personnel of the War in Afghanistan (2001–2021)
Military personnel from Hawaii
Recipients of the Defense Distinguished Service Medal
Recipients of the Distinguished Service Medal (US Army)
Recipients of the Defense Superior Service Medal
Recipients of the Legion of Merit
United States Army generals
Place of birth missing (living people)
United States Army Rangers
United States Military Academy alumni
Battle of Mogadishu (1993)
Delta Force